The Coast of Folly is a 1925 American silent drama film directed by Allan Dwan and starring Gloria Swanson in a dual role as mother and daughter. Richard Arlen had a small part in the film but his scenes were cut before its release. The film was based on the novel of the same name by Coningsby William Dawson, and adapted for the screen by James Ashmore Creelman.

Cast

Preservation
The Coast of Folly is now presumed lost though stills exist. It is one of eight films that Swanson and Dwan worked on together (four of which are now lost).

References

External links

Lobby poster
Stills at silenthollywood.com

1925 films
1925 drama films
Silent American drama films
American silent feature films
American black-and-white films
Famous Players-Lasky films
Films based on British novels
Films directed by Allan Dwan
Lost American films
Paramount Pictures films
1925 lost films
Lost drama films
1920s American films